Francis Sibley (20 February 1930, Baton Rouge - 14 June 2019, Columbus, Ohio) was an American musician and academic.

From 1967, he was employed at the University of Puget Sound in Tacoma, Washington. Sibley arranged for the English critic, I. A. Richards, to speak at the university. Sibley and Richards became friends, and Sibley went on to complete his PhD on the topic "I. A. Richards on Speculative Instruments", in 1970 at Louisiana State University. This established Sibley's reputation as a scholar.

Writing
 Dictionary of Quotations in Geography (1986) with James O. Wheeler

References

1930 births
2019 deaths
20th-century American musicians